Hugh Gordon may refer to:

Hugh Gordon (British Army officer) (1760–1823), British Army officer who became Lieutenant Governor of Jersey
Hugh Gordon (politician) (1817–1895), Scottish-born Australian politician.
Hugh Gordon (violin maker) (1794–1854), violin maker from Northern Ireland
Hugh Gordon (parasitologist) (1909-2002), Australian veterinary scientist

See also